John Duncan (1904–1998) was a 20th-century harpist.

History
Duncan was born on 2 January 1904 in Derbyshire, England and studied harp under Thomas Archibald Wragg and Charles Collier. He moved to Canada in 1927, where in 1930 he formed a group "The Old World Musicians", for whom he composed several works.

He died in Toronto on 9 June 1998.

References 

1904 births
1998 deaths
English harpists
Canadian harpists
Canadian composers
Canadian male composers
20th-century British male musicians
British emigrants to Canada